Lincoln Township is a township in Butler County, Kansas, United States.  As of the 2000 census, its population was 317.

History
Lincoln Township was organized in 1879.

Geography

Communities
The township contains the following settlements:
 Unincorporated community of De Graff.

Education
 Eden Christian School, Private Mennonite Grade School, approximately 3 miles south of Burns. Located at

Cemeteries
The township contains the following cemeteries:
 Eden Mennonite Church Cemetery, located in Section 20 T23S R5E.
 According to the USGS, it contains two cemeteries: Baker and Ridgeway.

Further reading

References

External links
 Butler County Website
 City-Data.com
 Butler County Maps: Current, 1936

Townships in Butler County, Kansas
Townships in Kansas